The Nine British Art is a private art gallery in St James's, central London, England. The gallery specializes in British art, with a focus on works from the St Ives group and the post-war period.

Overview
The gallery covers 20th and 21st century British art, mainly art since World War II, particularly paintings and sculptures by St Ives School artists. It also represents contemporary artists, holding regular group and solo exhibitions of artists including Robert Fogell, Richard Fox, Jeremy Gardiner, Jonathan S. Hooper, Keith Milow, Tim Woolcock, and Gary Wragg. The gallery has exhibited at the London Art Fair and the British Art Fair.

The gallery is a private limited company. It is owned and run by Stephen and Sylvia Paisnel.

History
The gallery was originally founded in 1977 as the Paisnel Gallery and changed its name in 2018. It was first on Fulham Road, London SW6, before moving to 22 Mason's Yard, London SW1, in the early 1990s. The gallery was established at its current location in Bury Street, London SW1, in 2006.

Exhibited artists
The following selected artists have been exhibited at and had artworks handled by the gallery:

 Trevor Bell
 Sandra Blow
 Frank Bowling
 Martin Bradley
 John Bratby
 Michael Canney
 Max Chapman
 Jonathan Clarke
 Robert Clatworthy
 Prunella Clough
 Maurice Cockrill
 John Copnall
 Alan Davie
 Leigh Davis
 Robyn Denny
 Paul Feiler
 Robert Fogell
 John Forrester
 Richard Fox
 Terry Frost
 Jeremy Gardiner
 William Gear
 Frederick Gore
 Peter Haigh
 Adrian Heath
 Barbara Hepworth
 Patrick Heron
 Ivon Hitchens
 Jonathan S. Hooper
 Peter Lanyon
 John Milne
 Keith Milow
 Denis Mitchell
 Henry Moore
 Paul Mount
 John Plumb
 George Hammond Steel
 Graham Sutherland
 Julian Trevelyan
 John Tunnard
 William Turnbull
 Keith Vaughan
 Brian Wall
 Billie Waters
 Frank Avray Wilson
 Tim Woolcock
 Gary Wragg
 Bryan Wynter

Selected exhibition publications

The gallery produces print and digital publications to accompany its exhibitions, with its online catalogues freely available via the Issuu electronic publishing platform. Examples of exhibition publications include:

 Leigh Davis: Pushing Boundaries (2022)
 St Ives Modern British Contemporary (2021)
 Leigh Davis: Further into Abstraction (2021)
 Jeremy Gardiner: South by Southwest (2020)
 St Ives, Modern British, Contemporary (2019)
 Jeremy Gardiner: Tintagel to Lulworth Cove (2019)
 Leigh Davis: A New Perspective (2018)
 St Ives & Post-War (2017) 
 Gary Wragg: Still Soaring at 70 (2017)
 Jeremy Gardiner: Drawn to the Coast (2017)
 40 Years On (2017)
 Jeremy Gardiner: Pillars of Light (2016)
 St Ives and Post-War (2016)
 20th Century British Art (2015)
 John Plumb: A Retrospective (2015)
 Peter Haigh: Paintings '84–'94 (2015)
 20th Century British Art (2014)
 Jeremy Gardiner: Exploring the Elemental (2013)
 Sculptures of Note and Prospect (2013)
 20th Century British Art (2013)
 20th Century British Art (2012)
 Frank Avray Wilson: The Vital Years (2011)
 20th Century British Art (2010)

References

External links

 The Nine British Art website

1977 establishments in England
2018 establishments in England
Art galleries established in 1977
Art galleries established in 2018
Art galleries in London
Contemporary art galleries in London
Buildings and structures in the City of Westminster
British art